Malik ibn Dinar Mosque is a mosque situated in the town of Kovalam in Tamil Nadu, India. The mosque contains the grave of Muslim saint Thameemul Ansari.

References 
 

Mosques in Tamil Nadu
Buildings and structures in Kanchipuram district